Bilbao Airport  is a minor international airport located  north of Bilbao, in the municipality of Loiu, in Biscay. It is the largest airport in the Basque Country and northern Spain, with 5,469,453 passengers in 2018. It is famous for its new main terminal opened in 2000 designed by Santiago Calatrava.

History

After various aeronautic experiments in the province of Biscay, in October 1927 steps were taken by the Union of Public Works to establish an airport in Bilbao. A Provincial Board was created to study the possible location of the airport. It was not until 1936 that the General Aeronautics Management authorised the installation of an airport in Sondika. However, due to the site's many deficiencies, the airport was not considered of interest. Bilbao is surrounded by mountains and a flat valley without significant population had to be found.

The construction works commenced during the Civil War but during this time and until June 1937 the airport was only used as a base for military activities. In 1938, the second stage of the airport's development began. The council resumed procedures with the government to modify the primitive project of 1936 and the drafting of a new project was authorised and later approved by the General Management of Infrastructure.

In 1940, it was decided by common agreement with the local organisations affected to build a civilian airport in Sondika. The construction works progressed slowly and on 19 September 1948, the airport was at last opened to daytime traffic with the establishment of an air path to Madrid by Aviación y Comercio, SA. Two years later, the terminal, named Carlos Haya after the well-known pilot from Bilbao, began to give service. At this time, the airport had an asphalt runway, the 11/29 (measuring ), another earth runway (measuring ), a taxiway, a passenger terminal, a tower control, a radio beacon, a direction finder as well as police, post office, weather, health, fuel and telephone services. In 1955, a taxiway was built to link the runway with the parking stands and terminal.

In 1975, the runway was surfaced and its orientation became 10/28 due to the change in magnetic declination. In 1977, the parking stand was extended, a link road was built and an ILS system was installed. As a result of the population density of the area, approaching planes may have to fly over the extensive Derio cemetery.

During the 1980s, the ILS landing system entered into service for runway 10/28; the communication centre, passenger terminal and parking facilities were enlarged; and a fire service building and cargo terminal were constructed.

On 19 February 1985, an Iberia flight from Madrid crashed into Mount Oiz, all passengers and crew died.

In 1996, a new taxiway with two rapid exits and a new aircraft parking apron were built. The works required the removal of tons of soil poisoned with lindane residues. In May 1999, the new tower control was put into service, which allowed for a more centred vision of the airfield and at the same time facilitated airport operations.

In February 2009, plans were announced to expand the terminal building, the facilities and the car parking so as to double the current capacity to 8 million passengers. The work was expected be finished in 2014 and cost €114 million but in 2010 the Spanish Government announced the project would be delayed by at least 5 years due to spending cuts and a decline in passenger numbers.

Design of the passenger terminal
The terminal has a sleek design, with two symmetrical "wings" and a sharp tip at its center which is especially visible when approaching the terminal from the sides. This original design has granted the building the nickname of La Paloma ("The Dove"). White concrete and glass have been used. The interiors are open and luminous spaces, distributed in two floors, the upper one for departures (check-in counters and gates) and the lower for arrivals.

There has been some criticism of Santiago Calatrava's design by Aena, the Spanish airport authority, because it seems difficult to make further enlargements in the terminal's capacity because the design is too closed. In spite of this, modifications took place in 2005–2006 in the check-in area to provide enhanced shopping facilities for travellers, which almost doubled the retail space now being offered.

Users of the airport widely complained about its lack of an arrivals area, since once passengers cleared customs, they stepped directly outside, and there they were often exposed to the elements. The airport built a glass-walled shelter to remedy this problem.

Traffic
The airport has seen a constant increase in its traffic numbers, the old terminal was already saturated and obsolete in 1990, although it had been renewed only a few years earlier. At the present day Bilbao is the most important hub in northern Spain and the number of passengers using the new terminal continues to rise, especially after the increased tourist interest in the city since the opening of the Guggenheim Museum Bilbao.

With the past increase of traffic, the terminal would have become saturated again in a year because it is designed to handle about 4.5 million passengers per year, in 2007 it went nearly to its maximum capacity. However, the global financial crisis of 2008 has reversed the situation as of early 2009, decreasing the number of passengers by 24% in January compared to previous year. In 2014 traffic is on the rise again and saw the recovery of passengers up to 5.4 million passengers by 2018.

Airlines and destinations
The following airlines operate regular scheduled and charter flights at Bilbao Airport:

Statistics

Top Carriers

Busiest routes

Public transport

Bus 
BizkaiBus: a bus line (A3247) connects Bilbao center (Moyúa square) and the city bus station with the airport.
A bus operated by PESA to Donostia-San Sebastián; its only stop is at Zarautz - adjacent to one of the town's two Euskotren stations (at the eastern end of the town).
A bus operated by PESA to Mondragón with stops in Eibar and Bergara; the last daily service continues until Oñati.

Metro extension 
There is a project to extend Metro Bilbao's Line 3 to the airport in the near future, but there is no official timetable yet.

Accidents and incidents
On 15 September 1975 British Airways flight NS552 operated by Trident 1E G-AVYD was written off at Bilbao while taking off.  The aircraft came off the runway following the commander's decision to abort the take-off on a wet runway at or close to V1.
On 19 February 1985, Iberia Flight IB610 from Madrid crashed into Mount Oiz. All 148 passengers and crew on board were killed.
On 7 February 2001, Iberia Airlines Flight 1456 arriving from Barcelona encountered wind shear while landing and suffered collapsed landing gear. All people on board survived but 25 people were injured.

See also
 List of airports in Spain

References

External links

  

Airports in the Basque Country (autonomous community)
Transport in Bilbao
Biscay
Santiago Calatrava structures
Airports established in 1928
1928 establishments in Spain